Diolenius is a genus of jumping spiders that was first described by Tamerlan Thorell in 1870.

Species
 it contains sixteen species, found only in Indonesian New Guinea (provinces of Papua and West Papua), Papua New Guinea and on the Moluccas:
Diolenius albopiceus Hogg, 1915 – New Guinea
Diolenius amplectens Thorell, 1881 – New Guinea
Diolenius angustipes Gardzińska & Zabka, 2006 – Indonesia (Biak Is.)
Diolenius armatissimus Thorell, 1881 – Indonesia (Moluccas), New Guinea
Diolenius bicinctus Simon, 1884 – Indonesia (Moluccas), New Guinea
Diolenius decorus Gardzińska & Zabka, 2006 – New Guinea
Diolenius infulatus Gardzińska & Zabka, 2006 – New Guinea, Papua New Guinea (New Britain)
Diolenius insignitus Gardzińska & Zabka, 2006 – Indonesia (Moluccas)
Diolenius lineatus Gardzińska & Zabka, 2006 – New Guinea
Diolenius lugubris Thorell, 1881 – New Guinea, Papua New Guinea (New Britain)
Diolenius paradoxus Gardzińska & Zabka, 2006 – New Guinea
Diolenius phrynoides (Walckenaer, 1837) (type) – Indonesia (Ambon, New Guinea)
Diolenius redimiculatus Gardzińska & Zabka, 2006 – New Guinea
Diolenius sarmiensis Gardzińska & Patoleta, 2013 – New Guinea
Diolenius varicus Gardzińska & Zabka, 2006 – New Guinea
Diolenius virgatus Gardzińska & Zabka, 2006 – New Guinea

References

Further reading
 

Salticidae genera
Salticidae
Spiders of Oceania
Taxa named by Tamerlan Thorell